Christina Hodson is a British screenwriter, known for Bumblebee (2018) and Birds of Prey (2020). Her 2016 film Shut In appeared on the 2012 Black List, an annual list of Hollywood's best-liked unproduced screenplays, as have two of her un-produced scripts.

Early life
Hodson is originally from London, England. She describes herself as "half-Taiwanese and half-Caucasian". She was educated at Wimbledon High School, London.

Career 
Hodson initially worked as a development executive in London for Focus Features. She transitioned from development executive to screenwriter in 2012 after her first screenplay, psychological thriller Shut In, made the 2012 Black List of best un-produced scripts. Hodson's Shut In was bought by David Linde's Lava Bear Films. The film, starring Naomi Watts, was directed by Farren Blackburn and released 11 November 2016.

In December 2013, Hodson's script Seed appeared on the 2013 Black List. In September 2014, Sony Pictures Entertainment acquired Hodson's female-centered sci-fi action script The Eden Project, which Tobey Maguire and Material Pictures would produce. That script later appeared on the 2014 Black List. In May 2015, Warner Bros. hired Hodson to write the new script for The Fugitive, based on the 1993 film of same name. Arnold Kopelson and Anne Kopelson would be returning as producers.

In June 2015, Hodson joined the team at Paramount Pictures tasked by Michael Bay with expanding the Transformers universe, under supervision of Akiva Goldsman. She wrote the script for the Bumblebee, a Transformers film that focuses on the title character, which was released in December 2018. Travis Knight, the director of Kubo and the Two Strings, was the director. Hodson also co-wrote the script of the film Unforgettable (2017) with David Leslie Johnson, which was acquired by Warner Bros. Producer Denise Di Novi directed the film.

By October 2016, she was working on a female-centric action epic for Nina Jacobson at Color Force and Fox 2000. The next month, it was announced she would be writing the screenplay for a Birds of Prey movie for Warner Bros., based on the DC Comics series of the same name and centered around Harley Quinn. The movie would later be titled, "Birds of Prey (and the Fantabulous Emancipation of One Harley Quinn)." 

In January 2018, it was announced that Hodson was among another team of writers assembled by Paramount with Akiva Goldsman, this time to work on adapting the Ology series of books alongside writers such as Lindsey Beer, Michael Chabon, Nicole Perlman, Jeff Pinkner, and Joe Robert Cole, many of whom she previously worked with in the Transformers "brain trust." In April of that same year, it was announced that she had been hired to write a Barbara Gordon / Batgirl film for Warner Bros. By July 2019, she was hired as screenwriter for a film centered around the DC comics character The Flash for Warner Bros, with the film set to be directed by It director Andy Muschietti. Like Birds of Prey, both of these films will be a part of the DC Extended Universe. However, the release of Batgirl was cancelled following the Warner Bros. Discovery merger. 

In November 2019, Hodson co-created The Lucky Exports Pitch Program with Morgan Howell and Margot Robbie, a program where six female identifying writers expanded their own logline or title into a screenplay. In October 2020, the six projects were announced, with Hodson set to produce each of them. 

In June 2020, it was announced Hodson would write the script for a new Pirates of the Caribbean film starring Margot Robbie. The movie was subsequently removed from the production schedule. 

In January 2023, Hodson had joined a writers' room assembled by James Gunn to map out the overarching story of the DC Universe.

Filmography

References

External links 
 

Living people
Year of birth missing (living people)
Writers from London
British women screenwriters
21st-century British women writers
Asian writers
English people of Taiwanese descent
21st-century British screenwriters